After statehood was achieved on September 9, 1850 and until 1865, California elected its congressional representatives statewide at-large — two representatives from September 11, 1850 to 1861, and 3 representatives from 1861 to 1865.

Also, from 1883 to 1885, California elected two of its six representatives to the United States House of Representatives statewide at-large.

List of members representing the district

Election results 

In these elections, the top two vote-getters (three from 1861 to 1863) were elected to the House.

1849
The election was held November 13, 1849.

1851
The 1851 election was held October 7, 1851.

1852
The election was held November 2, 1852.

1854
The election was held September 6, 1854.

1856
The election was held November 4, 1856.

1859
The election was held September 7, 1859.

1861
The election was held September 4, 1861.

1863
The election was held September 2, 1863.

1882
California elected two at-large representatives in addition to its four representatives in districts in 1882. For these results see 1882 United States House of Representatives elections in California.

See also
 Political party strength in California
 Political party strength in U.S. states

References

 
 
 Congressional Biographical Directory of the United States 1774–present
 California Elections Page 1849
 California Elections Page 1850
 California Elections Page 1852
 California Elections Page 1854
 California Elections Page 1856
 California Elections Page 1858
 California Elections Page 1861
 California Elections Page 1862

Sources
 Dubin, Michael J. (1998). United States Congressional elections, 1788-1997 : the official results of the elections of the 1st through 105th Congresses. Jefferson, N.C.: McFarland, 1998.

External links
 California Legislative District Maps (1911-Present)
 RAND California Election Returns: District Definitions
 Our Campaigns - United States - California - CA - At Large

At-large
Former congressional districts of the United States
At-large United States congressional districts
1850 establishments in California
Constituencies established in 1850
1865 disestablishments in California
Constituencies disestablished in 1865
Constituencies established in 1883
1883 establishments in California
Constituencies disestablished in 1885
1885 disestablishments in California